Summugam a/l Rengasamy is a Malaysian politician and served as Kedah State Executive Councillor.

Election Results

References 

Living people
People from Kedah
Malaysian people of Indian descent
 People's Justice Party (Malaysia) politicians
21st-century Malaysian politicians
Year of birth missing (living people)
Members of the Kedah State Legislative Assembly
 Kedah state executive councillors